Oudenaarde was a constituency used to elect members of the Belgian Chamber of Representatives between 1831 and 1995. Its main urban centre was the municipality of Oudenaarde.

Representatives

References

Defunct constituencies of the Chamber of Representatives (Belgium)